The Honolulu Painter painted designs on ancient Greek pottery in the Greek city-state of Corinth during the sixth century BCE.  Since he did not sign his work, his true name is unknown.  Based upon stylistic considerations, University of California at Berkeley archeology professor Darrell Arlynn Amyx (1911–1997) recognized several pieces of ancient pottery dispersed in museums around the world as having been painted by the same hand.  He named this anonymous artist the Honolulu Painter after his most important work, a pyxis in the collection of the Honolulu Museum of Art.

References
 Amyx, Darrell Arlynn, The Honolulu Painter and the ‘Delicate Style’, Antike Kunst, Vol. 5, 1962, pp. 3–8.

6th-century BC deaths
Ancient Greek vase painters
Anonymous artists of antiquity
Ancient Corinthians
Year of birth unknown